Little Yarra Steiner School & Kindergarten is an independent school located in Yarra Junction, Victoria, Australia, based on Rudolf Steiner's educational philosophy.

Name
Little Yarra Steiner School & Kindergarten is often referred to as 'Little Yarra', 'Little Yarra Steiner School', or 'LYSS'. The school's name is in part derived from the river which it abuts: Little Yarra River.

About the School
The school began in 1986 on rented premises in the Public Hall in Wesburn when a local farmer, Alan Earle, agreed to have the school built on his property along the Little Yarra River. This land, considered partly unsuitable for long-term building development, was sold allowing for the purchase of a 20 hectare block on Little Yarra Road, two kilometres South of the centre of Yarra Junction.

The school currently has over 250 students, ranging from Kindergarten to year 12.

The Little Yarra Steiner School is a registered independent, co-educational and non-denominational school managed by the College of Teachers. It is a member of the Rudolf Steiner Schools of Australia - an Association and the Association of Independent Schools of Victoria, and incorporated as a non-profit company in Victoria. The school receives recurrent funding from both the Victorian and Commonwealth government.

Most of the school buildings were designed by one of the school's founders and first class teachers, Johannes Schuster, working from biosculptural architecture, itself based on Steiner's architectural principles.

Notes and references

See also
Waldorf education
Curriculum of the Waldorf schools

External links
 LIttle Yarra Steiner School official site
 Biosculptural Architecture

Waldorf schools in Australia